Overmars is a French post-metal band, formed in 2001 in Lyon. Consisting of Xavier Théret (vocals), Antoine (guitar), Pierrick (guitar), Marion (bass), Ben (drums) and Bruno (keyboards), the band released its debut album, Affliction, Endocrine... Vertigo in 2005. Overmars released its follow-up, Born Again in 2007. The following year saw the release of another split EP with the band Icos and an EP entitled Büccolision with Kill the Thrill.

Compared to the band Swans, Overmars is noted for its "oppressive, droning, oftentimes sludgy interpretation of the post-metal genre. The band's debut album has been labeled as alternative metal with elements of doom metal, industrial, gothic rock, death metal and black metal. The band's second album, Born Again, is composed of a single 40-minute song and featured on NMEs list of "The Twenty Heaviest (Metal) Records of All Time".

Band members
Xavier Théret – vocals
Antoine – guitar
Pierrick – guitar
Marion – bass
Ben – drums
Bruno – keyboards

Discography
Studio albums
 Affliction, Endocrine... Vertigo (2005)
 Born Again (2007)

Split albums
 In the Arms of Octopus (2002, with Donefor)
 Fugue / Overmars (2003, with Fugue)
 Starkweather / Overmars (2010, with Starkweather)

EPs
 Overmars / Iscariote (2002, with Iscariote)
 The Road to Awe / Far from Home (2008, with Icos)
 Le Complexe Du Choix (2009)
 Büccolision (2008, with Kill the Thrill)

References

External links
 

Musical groups established in 2001
Musical groups disestablished in 2010
French heavy metal musical groups
Post-metal musical groups
Musical groups from Lyon